Mannie Garcia is an American freelance photojournalist currently based in Washington, D.C. His photos have been in many publications including TIME, The Washington Post and USA Today.

History
Garcia's photos of the Ramstein airshow disaster in West Germany won a World Press Photo Award in 1989. During the disaster, he narrowly escaped death when a flying chunk of one of the jet's wings nearly hit him in the head. One of his cameras was smashed by shrapnel, preventing it from hitting him instead. After shooting photos of the crashing jets and fleeing spectators, Garcia helped the wounded. Sixty-seven spectators and three pilots died in the disaster, and 346 spectators sustained serious injuries in the resulting explosion and fire.

In the early 1990s, Garcia shot photos of the Somali Civil War. In the mid-1990s he photographed the Bosnian War for The New York Times.

Garcia's photograph of President George W. Bush surveying the damage from Hurricane Katrina in August 2005 from the high remove of Air Force One became a symbol of his administration's slow and detached reaction to the human suffering and wreckage below.

In April 2006, Garcia took the photograph of Barack Obama that was later used uncredited by artist Shepard Fairey as the basis of Fairey's Barack Obama HOPE poster.

Arrest and lawsuit
In 2011, Garcia was arrested by a police officer in Wheaton, Maryland. According to Garcia, after he began taking pictures of a police incident across the street, one of the officers grabbed him by the neck, struck him, slammed his head onto a police car, and removed the memory chip from his camera. Garcia was charged with disorderly conduct and the police report claimed that he "threw himself to the ground, attempting to injure himself." He was acquitted of the charge several months later. His White House press credentials were not renewed because of the outstanding charge, but were renewed after the acquittal. On December 7, 2012, Garcia reinstated a lawsuit against Montgomery County, Maryland, its chief of police and several officers of the Montgomery County Police Department seeking among other things, compensatory and punitive damages. On March 4, 2013, the Justice Department filed a statement of interest with the district court hearing the lawsuit, asserting its position that citizens have a First Amendment right to peacefully photograph law enforcement officers in the exercise of their duties, and urging the court to rule against a motion to dismiss filed by the defendants.

On March 3, 2017, Montgomery County Associate Attorneys Patricia L. Kane and Jannette L. Frumkin, for Montgomery County, Maryland, accepted an agreement on behalf of Montgomery county Police officers, Christopher Malouf, Kevin Baxter as well as the county and paid Mr. Garcia $45,000.00 as result stemming from his unlawful arrest on June 16, 2011, on a public sidewalk in Montgomery County, Maryland for photographing an arrest. Later in 2017, legal damages (legal fees) were also awarded to Mr. Garcia's legal team headed up by Robert Corn-Revere Esq. and Ronald G. London Esq., of Davis Wright Tremaine LLP, Washington, DC, in an amount over $200,000.00.

Mickey Osterreicher, General Counsel of the NPPA (National Press Photographer's Association) was instrumental in championing this case involving freelance photojournalist Mannie Garcia and both the Police of Montgomery County and Montgomery County. The Montgomery County Police policy regarding the Press documenting Montgomery County Police in the line of duty has been changed.

References

External links
Mannie Garcia's Obama Image: Viewing Journalism as a Work of Art by Noam Cohen, The New York Times, March 23, 2009

American photographers
Year of birth missing (living people)
Living people
Associated Press photographers